The Painted Desert is a United States desert of badlands in the Four Corners area, running from near the east end of Grand Canyon National Park and southeast into Petrified Forest National Park. It is most easily accessed from the north portion of Petrified Forest National Park. The Painted Desert is known for its brilliant and varied colors: these include the more common red rock, but also shades of lavender.

History 

The Painted Desert was named by a Spanish expedition under Francisco Vázquez de Coronado during his 1540 quest to find the Seven Cities of Cibola. Finding the cities were not made of gold, Coronado sent an expedition to find the Colorado River to gain supplies. Passing through the wonderland of colors, they named the area El Desierto Pintado ("The Painted Desert").

Much of the Painted Desert within Petrified Forest National Park is protected as Petrified Forest National Wilderness Area, where motorized travel is limited. The park offers both easy and longer hikes into the colored hills. The Painted Desert continues north into the Navajo Nation, where off-road travel is allowed only by permit.

Geology
The desert is composed of stratified layers of siltstone, mudstone, and shale of the Triassic Chinle Formation, which erode easily. These fine-grained rock layers contain abundant iron and manganese compounds, which provide the pigments for the various colors of the region. Thin, resistant lacustrine limestone layers and volcanic flows cap the mesas. Numerous layers of silicic volcanic ash occur in the Chinle and provide the silica for the petrified logs of the area. The erosion of these layers has resulted in the formation of the badlands topography of the region.

In the southern portions of the desert, the remains of a Triassic period coniferous forest have fossilized over millions of years. Wind, water and soil erosion continue to change the face of the landscape by shifting sediment and exposing layers of the Chinle Formation. An assortment of fossilized prehistoric plants and animals are found in the region, as well as ancient dinosaur tracks and evidence of early human habitation.

Area and climate
The Painted Desert extends roughly from Cameron–Tuba City southeast to past Holbrook and the Petrified Forest National Park. Bordering southwest and south is the Mogollon Plateau, and on the plateau's south border the Mogollon Rim, the north border of the Arizona transition zone.

Owing to the strong rain shadow of the Mogollon Rim, the Painted Desert has a cold desert climate (Köppen BWk), with hot, dry summers and chilly (though virtually snow-free) winters. The annual precipitation is the lowest in northern Arizona and in many places is lower even than Phoenix.

Accessibility
Much of the region is accessible only by foot or unpaved road though major highways and paved roads cut across the area. The towns of Cameron and Tuba City, both on the Navajo Nation, are two major settlements. A permit is required for all backroad travel on the Navajo Nation.

In popular culture
 In the Disney film Melody Time, the character Pecos Bill gives the Painted Desert its name by using Native American war paint.
 In the orchestral suite Grand Canyon Suite by Ferde Grofé, the second movement is titled Painted Desert.

Gallery

See also
 Painted Hills, Oregon
 Painted Desert (South Australia)

References

External links

 Regional map for Navajo Lands
 Regional Map and Visitor Information for Hopi Lands
 National Park Services Website – Petrified Forest National Park
 Geology of the region
 Grand Canyon and Other Spectacular Sights in Arizona, on-the-matrix.com, (area of Painted Desert, 7500 sq mi
 Ecological Subregions of the United States – US Forest Service
 Petrified Forest Wilderness Area at Wilderness.net

Deserts of Arizona
Petrified Forest National Park
Geography of Apache County, Arizona
Geography of Coconino County, Arizona
Geography of Navajo County, Arizona
Geography of the Navajo Nation
Landmarks in Arizona
Natural history of Coconino County, Arizona
Regions of Arizona
Tourist attractions along U.S. Route 66
Tourist attractions in Apache County, Arizona
Tourist attractions in Coconino County, Arizona
Tourist attractions in Navajo County, Arizona